Marsha Sharp (born August 31, 1952) is the former head coach of Texas Tech University's women's basketball team, the Lady Raiders. She retired after 24 years at the conclusion of the 2005–06 season. Sharp was inducted into the Women's Basketball Hall of Fame in 2003.

Early life
Sharp went to high school in Tulia, Texas. She graduated in 1974 from Wayland Baptist University in Plainview. She procured her master's degree in 1976 from West Texas State University (now West Texas A&M University) in Canyon.

Coaching career
She became the head coach of the Lady Raiders in 1982. For most of the 1980s, Sharp's Lady Raiders were the second-best team in the Southwest Conference, behind the Texas Longhorns under Jody Conradt.  However, they dominated the last years of the SWC's existence, winning the last five regular season titles in a row (four outright, one shared) and three conference tournaments.  Her best team was the 1992–93 unit, led by Sheryl Swoopes, which won the first NCAA championship by a Texas Tech team in any sport.  After Texas Tech became a charter member of the Big 12 Conference in 1996, Sharp added three more regular season titles and two tournament titles.

Sharp's 24-year career won–lost records included a 258–89 record (.744 winning percentage) in conference play (Southwest Conference and Big 12 Conference combined) and a 572–189 record (.752 winning percentage) overall with no losing seasons.

In 2003, Sharp was inducted into the Women's Basketball Hall of Fame. The Marsha Sharp Center for Student-Athletes on the campus of Texas Tech and the Marsha Sharp Freeway in Lubbock are both named after Sharp.

Following Sharp's retirement from coaching, she was named Associate Athletic Director for Special Projects within the Texas Tech Athletic Department.

Head coaching record

Awards and honors
 1994—Russell Athletic/WBCA National Coach of the Year
 2003—Carol Eckman Award

References

External links
Player Bio
RedRaiders.com

1952 births
Living people
American women's basketball coaches
Basketball coaches from Texas
Sportspeople from Lubbock, Texas
Texas Tech Lady Raiders basketball coaches
Wayland Baptist Pioneers athletes
West Texas A&M University alumni